The .25-25 Stevens was an American centerfire rifle cartridge.

Designed by Capt. W. L. Carpenter, 9th U.S. Infantry, in 1895, the .25-25 Stevens was the company's first straight-cased cartridge. It was used in Stevens' single shot Model 44, as well as the Model  rifles, which first went on sale in 1903. In addition, it was available in the Remington-Hepburn target rifle.

While the .25-25 was popular, the .25-21 offered "practically the same performance and was a little cleaner shooting." It also suffered a "freakish" appearance, due to its length to diameter ratio.

The switch to smokeless powder only exacerbated the problem, due to the small charge.

The bore diameter of the .25-25 Stevens is .250 inches (6.35 mm) making it a ".25"/6.35 mm caliber" cartridge, not to be confused with the more well known 6.5 mm bore caliber which uses 6.7 mm/.264" bullets.

References

Sources
 

Pistol and rifle cartridges
Stevens Arms